Clare Barron is a playwright and actor from Wenatchee, Washington. She won the 2015 Obie Award for Playwriting for You Got Older. She was a finalist for the 2019 Pulitzer Prize for Drama for Dance Nation.

Early life 
In an interview, Barron said that she became interested in theatre in her early teens. "I was in a Shakespeare troupe for children in my hometown of Wenatchee, Washington, which was run by the playwright Heidi Schreck’s mother, Sherry Schreck." She attended the Tisch Summer Program while in high school, where she took a writing workshop. Barron graduated from Yale University. After acting for some time, she attended a workshop taught by Annie Baker and wrote a boy put this girl in a cage with a dog and the dog killed the girl. This led to Barron joining a writer's group at the Ensemble Studio Theatre.

Career

Acting
As a performer, Barron has appeared in several plays. Among others, she appeared in Uncle Vanya at the HERE Arts Center (New York City) in 2012 as Marina and The Essential Straight and Narrow at The New Ohio Theatre (New York City) in May 2014. Barron appeared in the play by Heidi Schreck The Consultant at the Long Wharf Theatre, New Haven in January 2014.

You Got Older
Barron was a member of Soho Rep's 2013/14 Writer/Director Lab, where she developed her play You Got Older. She received the Page 73 Playwriting Fellowship in 2014, and Page 73 produced You Got Older in October to November 2014 at the HERE Arts Center, New York City. The production was directed by Anne Kauffman and featured Reed Birney and Brooke Bloom. In 2015, You Got Older was nominated for the Drama Desk Award for Outstanding Play. She was featured on the 2015 Kilroys' List. The New Yorker reviewer wrote: "This terrific new play by Clare Barron, directed by Anne Kauffman for Page 73, offers a hilarious and painfully affecting blend of oddball dialogue, beautifully observed family dynamics, and a preoccupation with the weird ways of the body." She received the 2015 Obie Award for Playwriting for You Got Older.

Baby Screams Miracle
Her play Baby Screams Miracle was produced Off-Off-Broadway by Clubbed Thumb in their Summerworks Festival in May to June 2, 2013. Reviewer Sherri Kronfeld wrote: "...is a satisfyingly peculiar family-nightmare-mystery-storm-freakout-session, almost more dream than play at times." The Woolly Mammoth Theatre Company (Washington, DC) produced the play  early in 2017.

I'll Never Love Again
In 2016 her play I'll Never Love Again was produced at Bushwick Starr in Brooklyn, New York. It was a New York Times Critics' Pick by Ben Brantley, who wrote "...recalls the anguishing mysteries of sex and love during adolescence." The Time Out reviewer wrote: "Barron is a sharp, clear, virtuosic voice in the neorealist movement downtown.... The theme is Barron's awakening sexuality; at one point, she uses her body as an instrument."

Dance Nation
Barron's play Dance Nation received its world premiere Off-Broadway at Playwrights Horizons in April 2018. The play was the winner of the 2017 Susan Smith Blackburn Prize, which included a $25,000 award. The play involves pre-teen competitive dancers and their competition at the Boogie Down Grand Prix.

It was a finalist for the 2019 Pulitzer Prize for Drama. The committee wrote: "A refreshingly unorthodox play that conveys the joy and abandon of dancing, while addressing the changes to body and mind of its preteen characters as they peer over the precipice toward adulthood."

The reviewer for The New York Times Ben Brantley noted the "insanely talented playwright" and named the play a Critics Pick: "... conjures the passionate ambivalence of early adolesence..."

The play received the 2019 Drama Desk Award, Ensemble Award. The play received a 2019 Obie Award special citation for Clare Barron (playwright) and Lee Sunday Evans (director).

Personal
Clare Barron currently lives in Brooklyn.

Honors 
 Pulitzer Prize in Drama Finalist, 2019, Dance Nation
 Whiting Award in Drama, 2017 (which includes a monetary award of $50,000)
Susan Smith Blackburn Prize, 2017, Dance Nation
 Relentless Award, 2015, Dance Nation
 Obie Award for Playwriting, 2015, You Got Older
 Paula Vogel Playwriting Award, 2014
 Page 73 Playwriting Fellowship, 2014

Plays 
 Shhhh (2022)
 The Three Sisters (2020)
 Dance Nation (2018)
 I'll Never Love Again (2016)
 You Got Older (2014)
 Baby Screams Miracle (2013)
 Solar Plexus (2013)
 Dirty Crusty
 a boy put this girl in a cage with a dog and the dog killed the girl

References 

Living people
Obie Award recipients
American women dramatists and playwrights
21st-century American dramatists and playwrights
Yale University alumni
Writers from Brooklyn
People from Wenatchee, Washington
Year of birth missing (living people)
21st-century American women writers